Furman is a locality in Alberta, Canada.

The community has the name of John Furman, a pioneer citizen.

References 

Localities in the Municipal District of Willow Creek No. 26